Lionel Massey (July 2, 1916 – July 28, 1965) was a Canadian civil servant and dignitary, most noted for serving as Secretary to the Governor General of Canada during his father Vincent Massey's term as Governor General.

Born in Toronto to Vincent and Alice Massey, he was educated at Upper Canada College and Balliol College, Oxford. He served in the King's Royal Rifle Corps during World War II, during which he was injured in Greece and spent time as a German prisoner of war.

He returned to Canada in 1944, and married Lilias Ahearn Van Buskirk in 1946. The couple's primary residence was Batterwood House in Canton, Ontario, although they travelled frequently on family business.

His brother Hart also served in WWII, as a Spitfire pilot.

When Vincent Massey was appointed as Governor General in 1952, he appointed Lionel as secretary; as Alice Massey had by this time died and there would be no viceregal consort, Lilias was simultaneously appointed as acting châtelaine of Rideau Hall.

Following the end of Vincent Massey's term in office, Lionel was appointed as administrative director of the Royal Ontario Museum. He was promoted to associate director of the institution in 1963. He also served on the boards of Hart House, Upper Canada College and the Stratford Festival.

He died in Toronto on July 28, 1965 after suffering a stroke.

References

1916 births
1965 deaths
Lionel Massey
Canadian civil servants
Canadian corporate directors
King's Royal Rifle Corps officers
Military personnel from Toronto
Upper Canada College alumni
Royal Ontario Museum
British Army personnel of World War II
Alumni of Balliol College, Oxford
British World War II prisoners of war
World War II prisoners of war held by Germany